Dingleberry Lake is a natural lake in Inyo County, California, in the United States. The lake was so named on account of dingleberries hanging on the rear of sheep in the area.

The Sabrina Lake Trail leads hikers to Dingleberry Lake. Dingleberry Lake is a popular camping site. The lake contains a population of brook trout.

See also

 List of lakes in California

References

Lakes of Inyo County, California
Lakes of California
Lakes of Northern California